Domenico Roberto Alberico (born 23 January 1999) is a professional footballer who plays as a midfielder for Regionalliga Bayern club Würzburger Kickers. Born in Germany, Alberico has represented both his country of birth and Italy at youth international levels.

Club career
Born in Pforzheim, Alberico started his career in Karlsruhe's youth sector. 

In 2014, he moved to Hoffenheim. From 2018, he played for Hoffenheim's reserve team in the Regionalliga.

He left Hoffenheim and joined VfB Stuttgart's reserve team in the 2020–21 season.

On 13 August 2021, he moved to Italian Serie C club Viterbese. On 2 August 2022, Alberico's contract with Viterbese was terminated by mutual consent.

On 17 January 2023, after a successful trial with Würzburger Kickers, Alberico officially joined the Regionalliga Bayern club on a free transfer.

International career
Alberico made his Germany U-16 debut on 18 March 2015. Ironically, this match was played against his ancestral country of Italy.

He represented Italy at the 2019 FIFA U-20 World Cup.

References

External links
 
 
 

1999 births
Living people
Sportspeople from Pforzheim
Footballers from Baden-Württemberg
Italian footballers
German footballers
Association football midfielders
Regionalliga players
Serie C players
VfB Stuttgart II players
TSG 1899 Hoffenheim II players
U.S. Viterbese 1908 players
Würzburger Kickers players
Germany youth international footballers
Italy youth international footballers